Maillen Airfield , located near Assesse, Namur, Wallonia, Belgium accepts only (European style) ultralights.

See also
 List of airports in Belgium

References

External links 
 Loisir Club Mosan 
 Aéroclub "Les Houssières" Maillen 
 Airport record at Landings.com

Airports in Namur (province)